Argumentum ad baculum (Latin for "argument to the cudgel" or "appeal to the stick") is the fallacy committed when one makes an appeal to force to bring about the acceptance of a conclusion. One participates in argumentum ad baculum when one emphasizes the negative consequences of holding the contrary position, regardless of the contrary position's truth value — particularly when the argument-maker himself causes (or threatens to cause) those negative consequences. It is a special case of the appeal to consequences.

Examples
The Stanford Encyclopedia of Philosophy gives this example of argumentum ad baculum:

 If you don’t join our demonstration against the expansion of the park, we will evict you from your apartment.
 So, you should join our demonstration against the expansion of the park.

The phrase has also been used to describe the 1856 caning of Charles Sumner, an abolitionist Senator, by one of his pro-slavery opponents, Preston Brooks, on the floor of the United States Senate.

See also
Argument from authority
Conformity (psychology)
Formal fallacy
In terrorem
Legal threat
Management by perkele
Might makes right
Proof by intimidation

References

Causal fallacies
Latin logical phrases
Informal fallacies
Relevance fallacies